TEN is the ninth studio album by the Canadian rock band Trooper, released in 1991, containing the hit "American Dream". The album reached No. 52 on the Canadian Albums Chart. As of 2021, it is the group's most recent studio album.

Track listing
(McGuire/Smith)
 3:43 - "The American Dream"
 4:09 - "Too Much, Too Easy"
 2:53 - "Simple Thing"
 4:22 - "Kids in Love"
 4:06 - "What Day Is This?"
 4:07 - "Don't Let Nothin' Bring You Down"
 3:44 - "True Love"
 3:43 - "Fight for Freedom"
 4:02 - "Stop Thinkin'"
 4:14 - "What the Hell's Goin' On?"

Band members

 Vocals - Ra McGuire
 Guitar - Brian Smith
 Drums - John Stoltz
 Bass - Larry Church
 Keyboards - Blaine Smith

Singles
 "The American Dream"
 "Kids In Love"

References

Trooper (band) albums
1991 albums